Divorce Attorney Shin is an ongoing South Korean television series starring Cho Seung-woo, Han Hye-jin, Kim Sung-kyun, and Jung Moon-sung. Based on a webtoon of the same name by Kang Tae-kyung, it premiered on JTBC on March 4, 2023, and airs every Saturday and Sunday at 22:30 (KST). It is also available for streaming on TVING in South Korea and Netflix in selected regions.

Synopsis 
The series depicts the turbulent story of Shin Sung-han (Cho Seung-woo) who is a lawyer specializing in divorce.

Cast

Main 
 Cho Seung-woo as Shin Sung-han
A professor at a music college in Germany, but one day he receives shocking news and becomes a lawyer specializing in divorce litigation.
 Han Hye-jin as Lee Seo-jin
A former weathercaster who is currently working as a radio DJ.
 Kim Sung-kyun as Jang Hyeong-geun
Sung-han's middle school friend and an office manager in Sung-han's lawyer's office.
 Jung Moon-sung as Jo Jeong-sik
CEO of Jo Jeong-sik Real Estate, who is Sung-han and Hyeong-geun's middle school friend.

Recurring 
 Kang Mal-geum as Kim So-yeon
The youngest daughter of a grandmother at a ramen restaurant.
Cha Hwa-yeon as Ma Geum-hee
Jeong-guk's mother. The hostess of Daenam Electronics.
Jeon Bae-soo as Park Yu-seok
A partner lawyer at Geumhwa Law Firm.
Noh Susanna as Jin Young-joo
Jeong-guk's wife.
Han Eun-seong as Choi Jun
An intern lawyer at Geumhwa Law Firm.
Lee Eun-jae as Yoo Sae-bom
An employee at Sung-han's lawyer office.
Kim Tae-hyang as Seo Jeong-guk
Young-joo's husband and Ju-hwa's ex-husband. The only son of Daenam Electronics.
Yoo Joo-hye as Bang Ho-yong
Radio PD and Seo-jin's co-worker.
Kong Hyun-ji as Shin Ju-hwa  
Sung-han's sister and Jeong-guk's ex-wife.
Kim Joon-eui as Seo Gi-yeong
Jeong-guk and Ju-hwa's son.
Kang Hye-won as Seo Ha-yul
Jeong-guk and Young-joo's daughter.

Others

Divorce case 1 
Park Jung-pyo as Kang Hee-sub
Seo-jin's ex-husband.
Jang Seon-yul as Kang Hyun-woo
Hee-sub and Seo-jin's son.

Divorce case 2 
Hwang Jung-min as Park Ae-ran
Byeong-cheol's wife. The client who beat her mother-in-law.
Lee Sang-goo as Seo Byeong-cheol
Ae-ran's husband.
Heo Jin as Park Eul-boon
Byeong-cheol's mother.
Park Se-yeong as Seo Mi-yeong
Byeong-cheol and Ae-ran's eldest daughter.
Lee Seo-yeon as Seo Mi-so
Byeong-cheol and Ae-ran's youngest daughter.

Divorce case 3 
Chun Joong-yong as Choi Jung-ho  
Ji-yeon's husband.
Kim Si-young as Kim Ji-sook
A hairdresser who is having an affair with Jung-ho.
Oh Yoon-hong as Park Ji-yeon
Jung-ho's wife.
Cha Sung-je as Choi Min-soo
Jung-ho and Ji-yeon's son.

Minor role 
Lee Soo-bin as Park Chae-rin (Ep. 2)
 Sung-han's former student. A pianist.
Min Jae-wan as a PD (Ep. 3)
Kim Gwang-sik as Mr.Jung (Ep. 5)
Oh Soon-tae as Ji-eun's boyfriend (Ep. 5)

Special appearance 
Ahn Dong-goo as Jung Ji-hoon (Ep. 1)
A Chef who is having an affair with Seo-jin.
Jang So-yeon as Ji-eun (Ep. 3, 5, 6)
Hyeong-geun's separated wife, who request a divorce and was living with another man.

Production 
On January 26, 2023, photos from the script reading site were released.

Viewership

References

External links 
  
 
 
 

Korean-language television shows
JTBC television dramas
Television series by JTBC Studios
Television shows based on South Korean webtoons
2023 South Korean television series debuts
2020s legal television series
2020s drama television series
South Korean legal television series
South Korean drama television series
Korean-language Netflix exclusive international distribution programming